The East Amazonian fire-eye (Pyriglena leuconota) is an insectivorous bird in the antbird family Thamnophilidae. It is found in Brazil. Its natural habitats are subtropical or tropical dry forests, subtropical or tropical moist lowland forests, and subtropical or tropical moist montane forests.

Taxonomy
The East Amazonian fire-eye was described and illustrated by the German naturalist Johann Baptist von Spix in 1824 and given the binomial name Myothera leuconota. The current genus Pyriglena was introduced by the German ornithologist Jean Cabanis in 1847.

References

External links
Xeno-canto: audio recordings of the white-backed fire-eye

East Amazonian fire-eye
Birds of Brazil
East Amazonian fire-eye
Taxonomy articles created by Polbot